Distributive writing is the collective authorship (or distributed authorship) of texts.

This further requires both a definition of collective and texts, where collective means a connected group of individuals and texts are inscribed symbols chained together to achieve a larger meaning than isolated symbols. This places emphasis on texts being represented as writings. This could be written words, iconic symbology (e.g., graffiti), computer programming languages (C/C++, Java, Perl, etc.), meta-level mark-up (HTML, XML, SVG, PostScript), and their derivative works. Also, not to be excluded are all the above in various languages. Further, to define texts, we must also have an interpreter for the texts. For computer programming languages, we have a compiler, for writings we have written words interpreted by our mental faculties, and for meta-level mark-up there are web browsers, printers to interpret postscript, and various software applications which turn textual representations into another format. (Patrick Deegan and Jon Phillips, 2004)

In ancient and oral literatures 
The concept of distributed authorship has been applied to oral traditions in which one person's telling of a traditional story reflects the oral recitations of many previous tellers. It has likewise been applied to oral-derived written traditions, where a manuscript text is shaped by its transmission through multiple scribes, each of whom may alter the text.

Software to support distributive writing

Social Software 
Social Software enables people to connect, communicate, and collaborate. It is explicitly the social which is of importance and is what is operated on. It is the commodity in the system. This is different from Distributive Writing because social software is based upon software, whereas DW is not, and is not just about collaborative writing. It is also about other forms of socializing.

Collaborative software, aka Groupware 
GroupWare is about software and more importantly, in common use to describe combining many pieces of software together into a group for so-called easy access for an individual. The original definition had to do with a group of people operating on something collaboratively through software, but this has changed meaning due to corporate appropriation to describe software suites like Microsoft Office and LibreOffice.

Computer-supported collaboration (CSCT) 
Distributive writing is not just bound to computing like CSCT.

Types 
Synchronous – System of authorship where both author's make changes in real time (at the same time).

Asynchronous – System of authorship where both author's make changes in non-real time (render time or not at the time).

References

External links
When No One’s Home: Being a Remote Writer in Distributed Teams
 Essential Skills for Every Writer - Infographic

Writing